Devario browni is a species of fish in the family Cyprinidae found in fast-flowing, shaded streams in the Salween River drainage; it feeds mainly on terrestrial insects, including ants and flies.

References

External links
 danios.info (Devario browni)

Devario
Fish described in 1907